The Mega II is a custom chip from Apple Computer that is essentially an entire Apple II computer-on-a-chip. At least three products from Apple made use of the chip between 1986 and 1995. It was most predominantly used in the Apple IIGS microcomputer, and the basis for a modified variant, called the "Gemini" chip, which was later used in the Apple IIe Card for the Macintosh LC. This custom application-specific integrated circuit (ASIC) integrated most of the circuitry from earlier Apple II models onto one 84-pin PLCC integrated circuit, drastically simplifying design and cost for Apple. The Mega II contained the functional equivalent of an entire Apple IIe computer (sans processor),  which, combined with the 65C02 emulation mode of the 65C816 processor, plus ROM and RAM, provided full support for legacy (8-bit) Apple II software in the Apple IIGS. The result was one of the earliest single chip examples of full system hardware emulation.

The Mega II has the built-in equivalent of the IOU and memory management unit (MMU) chips, video and keyboard ROMs (with support for other display languages) and likely the keyboard encoder found in the IIe. It also has a built-in keyboard and mouse controller (neither were used in the Apple IIGS). Potentially the Mega II could have been used to produce future models of the 8-bit Apple II with a very low chip count (and reduced physical size) but instead used for IIe emulation on the Apple IIGS and Macintosh LC with plug-in card, which used a similar all-in-one IC based on it. It was also used as support circuitry on the Apple II Video Overlay Card.

History 
In 1984, after the cancellation of the Apple IIx project, Dan Hillman and Jay Rickard, engineers at Apple, were assigned to lower the cost of the Apple II.  They were able to compress the design of almost the entire Apple II onto one chip which they named Mega II. When the 16-bit Apple IIGS project came onto the table, the virtually completed design of the Mega II was a clear starting point for seamless backwards 8-bit system compatibility.

References 

Apple II family